Paul P. Bernstein (born 1934) is an American businessman and philanthropist.

Biography
Paul was born to a Jewish family in 1934 in The Bronx, the son of Jack and Martha Bernstein. His father worked in a jewelry store eventually becoming a minor partner. He went to William Howard Taft High School. He had an older brother Zalman Bernstein (1926–1999). In 1956, he graduated with a bachelor's degree in Economics from New York University where he was a member of the Jewish fraternity Alpha Epsilon Pi. He joined the United States Army after school where he was assigned to Fort Dix and later Fort Benjamin Harrison where he was enrolled in a typing and shorthand school; he avoided going to Korea because he graduated first in his class.

In 1957, his brother secured him a job as a broker with Dreyfus Funds. In 1960, he moved to Oppenheimer Holdings after Dreyfus reduced the commissions and was able to secure a job for his brother. In the 1960s, his brother left Oppenheimer eventually starting his own firm with two partners (Archer Scherl and Stanley Edgna) and soon after hired his brother as a salesman. His two partners left after 6 months for other opportunities (the firm was renamed Sanford Bernstein); Zalman was able to convince former Oppenheimer associates, Shepard D. Osherow, Roger Hertog, Lewis A. Sanders, and Shelly Lawrence to join his firm. The company emphasized research over money management.

Sanford C. Bernstein
Paul and his brother, Zalman Bernstein, created a firm that was revolutionary for its time.  They only accepted discretionary accounts and based investment decisions on a dividend discount model, which relied upon their formula for calculating future earnings of companies in whom they invested.  Their investment model required robust and accurate research to be successful, and Sanford C. Bernstein quickly became well respected on Wall Street for their superior research.

Paul is known as a "great salesman" and was responsible for bringing in most of the firm's accounts, especially in the early days.   Sanford C. Bernstein's assets under management grew to over $80 billion from more than 25,000 private and institutional clients. The firm was eventually sold to Alliance Capital Management and is part of what is known as AllianceBernstein today.

Philanthropy
Paul has become one of the most well-known people in New York City and Seabourn cruises over the past few decades.  He's been very involved in charities including Seeds of Peace, The Seeing Eye, and K-9 Companions.  Paul had a role in the movie Serendipity, and produced the movie and book for Besa, a story about Muslims who risked their lives to save Jews during the Holocaust.

Personal life
Paul is an avid traveler, patron of the arts, and sports enthusiast.  He currently resides in Manhattan with his wife Peggy.

References

External links

1934 births
People from the Bronx
New York University alumni
Jewish American philanthropists
20th-century American businesspeople
Living people
21st-century American Jews